Vojtěch Štursa (born 3 August 1995) is a Czech ski jumper. He competed in two events at the 2018 Winter Olympics.

References

External links
 

1995 births
Living people
Czech male ski jumpers
Olympic ski jumpers of the Czech Republic
Ski jumpers at the 2018 Winter Olympics
Place of birth missing (living people)